Paul Simpkins is an Australian former professional rugby league referee, officiating in the Australian first-grade competition, National Rugby League.  In addition to regularly working the NRL, Simpkins also officiated at the annual State of Origin tournament between Queensland and New South Wales and the Tri-Nations series. Simpkins officially announced his retirement from refereeing in October, 2007, to further his career with the New South Wales Police Force.

Career highlights
 2006 NRL Grand Final
 2006 Tri-nations test series
 State of Origin

References
 Rleague.com referee profile.  Accessed 26 May 2007.

Year of birth missing (living people)
Living people
National Rugby League referees
Australian rugby league referees
Australian police officers
Rugby League World Cup referees